Sisters is an Australian television drama series, created by Jonathan Gavin and Imogen Banks, and produced by Imogen Banks and Nicole O'Donahue, that screened locally on Network Ten in October 2017 and launched as a Netflix Original Series on September 1, 2018.

Synopsis
Sisters follows the story of Julia Bechly as her life is turned upside-down when her father, in vitro fertilisation pioneer Dr Julius Bechly, publishes a deathbed confession that during his award-winning 30 year career as a fertility specialist, he used his own sperm and is potentially the father of hundreds of children. Julia decides to make the most of the situation and throws a family gathering where she finds out she has hundreds of brothers, but only two sisters: troubled children's television star Roxy Karibas and belligerent lawyer Edie Flanagan.

Cast

Main
 Maria Angelico as Julia Bechly
 Lucy Durack as Roxy Karibas
 Antonia Prebble as Edie Flanagan
 Barry Otto as Julius Bechly
 Charlie Garber as Isaac Hulme
 Dan Spielman as Tim
 Roy Billing as Ron Karibas
 Magda Szubanski as Diane Karibas
 Catherine McClements as Genevieve
 Lindsay Farris as Carl Logan
 Zindzi Okenyo as Amanda

Recurring
 Joel Creasey as Oscar
 Remy Hii as Sam
 Maude Davey as Barbara
 Ming-Zhu Hii as Angela
Zahra Newman as Felicity
 Emily Barclay as Casey

Episodes

Ratings

American remake

In February 2019, U.S. network Fox ordered a pilot for a U.S. remake of Sisters with Annie Weisman and Jason Katims (The Path and Parenthood) producing. Not Just Me was ordered to series on Fox in May 2019, for 2019–20 United States network television season. However in June 2019, reported that the series change the title to Almost Family.

References

External links 
 
 

Network 10 original programming
Australian drama television series
2017 Australian television series debuts
2017 Australian television series endings
English-language television shows
Television shows set in Victoria (Australia)
Television series by Endemol Australia